KVIN (920 kHz) is a commercial AM radio station broadcasting an Oldies radio format. Licensed to Ceres, California, it serves the Stockton and Modesto radio markets.  The station is owned by Threshold Communications and airs Top 40 hits from the 1950s, 60s and 70s. The station is 100% automated with no on air disc jockeys.  On Saturday nights a big band show is featured, "Swing Thing" hosted by Fred Hall.

KVIN has two FM translator stations rebroadcasting its programming:  92.3 K222BX in Modesto and 107.1 K296HL in Manteca.  KVIN is one of few AM radio stations that increases its power at night.  By day, KVIN runs at 500 watts but at sunset, power increases to 2,500 watts.  It uses a directional antenna at all times.  The daytime transmitter is off Iowa Avenue in Riverdale Park and the nighttime transmitter is off Hickman Road in Hickman.

KVIN and sister station KRVR are the Modesto area's only locally owned radio stations.

History
The station first signed on the air on September 15, 1963, as KLOC.  It was founded by country music artist Chester Smith, who served as general manager.  The station was a daytimer, required to go off the air from sunset to sunrise.  Reflecting its owner, KLOC played only Country and Western music.

The station was acquired by Threshold Communications in 2001 for $400,000.  The call sign was changed to KVIN.  It formerly featured programming provided from Jones Radio Network (Music Of Your Life)and Dial Global/Westwood One's "America's Best Music" until December 2013.

UPDATE: This update from the station is taken from the  http://kvin.net/contests link (or the KVIN Info link at the bottom of the homepage)

On November 10, 2022, Threshold Communications, licensee of KVIN, 920 AM, Ceres California; K222BX, 92.3 FM, Modesto, California; and K296HL, 107.1 FM Manteca, California, filed applications with the Federal Communications Commission for consent to assign the stations to Punjabi American Media, LLC.  Members of the public wishing to view these applications or obtain information about how to file comments and petitions can visit the KVIN public inspection file at www.https://publicfiles.fcc.gov/am-profile/KVIN. 

The link referenced above seems to be broken.  The KVIN homepage no longer has a link to the to the FCC Public Inspection file.  You can find the application for transfer to the new owner by entering KVIN in the call sign of this FCC website: https://enterpriseefiling.fcc.gov/dataentry/public/tv/publicAppSearch.html

References

External links
 FCC History Cards for KVIN

VIN
Mass media in Stanislaus County, California
Mass media in Tuolumne County, California
Ceres, California
Radio stations established in 1963
1963 establishments in California
Oldies radio stations in the United States